Ivan Pucelj (born 11 July 1981) is a retired Croatian long jumper. His personal best jump was 7.92 metres, achieved in July 2003 in Ljubljana.

He was born in Zagreb. He finished tenth at the 2002 European Indoor Championships, eighth at the 2003 Summer Universiade, sixth at the 2005 European Indoor Championships and fourth at the 2005 Summer Universiade.

Pucelj became Croatian long jump champion in 2002, 2005 and 2006, rivalling with Marijo Baković. 

He also became indoor champion in 2005 and 2006.

Competition record

References

1981 births
Living people
Croatian male long jumpers
Sportspeople from Zagreb
Competitors at the 2003 Summer Universiade
Competitors at the 2005 Summer Universiade
Competitors at the 2007 Summer Universiade
Athletes (track and field) at the 2005 Mediterranean Games
Mediterranean Games competitors for Croatia
20th-century Croatian people
21st-century Croatian people